, is a stand-alone masculine Japanese given name or a common name suffix (literally meaning "eldest son"). Tarō can also be used as a surname, but the etymology and kanji are different.

Possible writings
The name Taro can have many different meaning depending on the kanji characters used to write it. The name can also be written using the hiragana or katakana writing systems. Possible variations of the name Taro include:
太郎, "strong, heroic, masculine"
多朗, "abundance, prolific, melodious"
立楼, "stand up, upright, watchtower"
汰滝, "selected waterfall"

People with the given name
Taro Achi (阿智 太郎, born 1980), Japanese light novelist and screenwriter
Akebono Tarō (曙 太郎, born 1969), retired sumo wrestler from Hawaii
, Japanese slalom canoeist
Asashio Tarō IV (born 1955), retired sumo wrestler from Muroto, Japan
Taro Aso (麻生 太郎, born 1940), Japanese politician and the 92nd Prime Minister of Japan
Taro Chiezo (千恵藏 太郎), Manhattan based, Japanese artist
Taro Gold (金太郎, born 1969), American writer, entertainer, and entrepreneur  
Tarō Gomi (五味 太郎, born 1945), a Japanese children's book illustrator and writer
Taro Hakase (葉加瀬 太郎, born 1968), musician, violinist, and composer from Suita, Japan
, Japanese opera singer
Taro Ishida (石田 太郎, 1944–2013), a Japanese voice actor, and actor from Kyoto, Japan
Taro Iwashiro (岩代 太郎, born 1965), a Japanese composer
, Japanese footballer
Katsura Tarō (桂 太郎, 1848–1913), Japanese soldier who served in the Imperial Japanese Army, and was Prime Minister of Japan three times in a row
, Japanese journalist
, Japanese politician
Taro Kono (河野 太郎, born 1963), a Japanese politician of the Liberal Democratic Party and a member of the House of Representatives
Taro Kudo (工藤 太郎), a Japanese video game designer and video game music composer
Maruse Taro (マルセ太郎, 1933–2001), Japanese mime artist, comedian, vaudevillian and movie star
, Japanese voice actor 
Tarō Okamoto (岡本 太郎, 1911–1996), a Japanese artist from Kawasaki Japan
Taro Shoji (東海林 太郎, 1898–1972), a Japanese ryūkōka singer
, Japanese footballer
Taro Teshima (born 1912), Japanese rower
Taro Urabe (卜部 太郎, born 1977), former Japanese football player
Taro Yamaguchi (山口 太郎, born 1970), Japanese actor
Taro Yamasaki, Japanese American Pulitzer Prize-winning photographer and the eldest son of architect Minoru Yamasaki
Tarō Yamamoto (山本 太郎, born 1974), Japanese politician and actor who is well known for portraying Shogo Kawada in Battle Royale
Taro Yamamoto (artist) (1919-1994), Japanese American abstract expressionist artist who served in the U.S. Army during the Second World War
Taro Yashima (八島太郎, 1908-1994), pseudonym of a Japanese artist and expatriate in the United States
Yoko Taro, a Japanese video game director and scenario writer

Names of Notable People with -tarō as a name suffix
Jutarō
Komura Jutarō (小村 壽太郎, 1855–1911), Japanese politician and a statesman and diplomat in the Meiji Period
Kantarō
Nakamura Kantarō II (二代目 中村 勘太郎, born 1981), the former stage name of Nakamura Kankuro VI(六代目 中村 勘九郎), Japanese kabuki, film, and television actor
Kantarō Suzuki (鈴木 貫太郎, 1868–1948), an admiral in the Imperial Japanese Army, and the former Prime Minister of Japan
Kitarō (given name)
Kataro Shirayamadani (1865–1948), a Japanese ex-patriate ceramics painter who did most of his work in Cincinnati, Ohio, United States
Kōtarō
Kotaro Koizumi (小泉 孝太郎, born 1978), Japanese actor and the eldest son of former Prime Minister Junichiro Koizumi
Kyōtarō
Kyotaro Nishimura (西村 京太郎), Japanese mystery novelist
Rentarō
Rentarō Mikuni (三國 連太郎, born 1923), Japanese film actor
Rentarō Taki (滝 廉太郎, 1879–1903), a Japanese composer, and pianist who is widely regarded as one of the best-known composers of Japan
Ryōtarō
Ryōtarō Shiba (司馬 遼太郎, 1923–1996), Japanese historical novel author from Osaka
Ryōtarō Sugi (杉良太郎, born 1944), Japanese actor and singer from Kobe
Ryūtarō
Ryutaro Hashimoto (橋本 龍太郎, 1937–2006), Japanese politician and the 83rd Prime Minister of Japan
Sakutarō
Sakutarō Hagiwara (萩原 朔太郎, 1886–1942), Japanese poet and writer
Shintarō
Shintaro Abe (安倍 晋太郎, 1924–1991), Japanese politician, and father of former Prime Minister, Shinzo Abe
Shintarō Ishihara (石原 慎太郎, born 1932), Japanese politician, author, and the Governor of Tokyo from 1999-2012
Shintaro Katsu (勝 新太郎, 1931–1997), Japanese actor, producer, director, and singer
Shōtarō
Shōtarō Ikenami (池波 正太郎, 1923–1990), Japanese author who won the Naoki Award for popular literature in 1960 
Shotaro Ishinomori (石ノ森 章太郎, 1938–1998), Japanese manga artist known for his works such as Cyborg 009 and Himitsu Sentai Gorenger
Shuntarō
Shuntarō Tanikawa (谷川 俊太郎, born 1931), a Japanese poet and translator
Tsurutarō
Tsurutarō Kataoka (片岡 鶴太郎, born 1954), a Japanese comedian, actor, artist, and professional boxer
Umetarō
Umetaro Suzuki (鈴木 梅太郎, 1874–1943), Japanese scientist from the Shizuoka Prefecture of Japan
Yatarō
Iwasaki Yatarō (岩崎 弥太郎, 1835–1885), Japanese businessman, financier, shipping industrialist, and founder of Mitsubishi

Characters
Momotarō, the hero from a fairy tale
Jotarō Kujō, the protagonist of JoJo's Bizarre Adventure: Stardust Crusaders
Rantaro Amami, a character in Danganronpa V3: Killing Harmony
Monotaro, one of the Monokubs in Danganronpa V3: Killing Harmony
Kitarō, the titular protagonist of the GeGeGe no Kitarō manga series created by Shigeru Mizuki
Kintarō, the hero from a fairy tale
Urashima Tarō, the hero from a fairy tale
Shippeitaro, the hero from a fairy tale
Ultraman Taro, the sixth Ultra Brother
Taro Soramame, a character in Dr. Slump media
Taro Kagami of the pilot version of Death Note
Taro Namatame, an antagonist of Persona 4
Taro Kato, a character in Gorenger
Taro, a character in Disgaea 2: Cursed Memories
Taro Nagazumi, a character in Mind Your Language
Hamtaro, Japanese hamster character.
Ryoutarou Nogami, a character in Kamen Rider Den-O
Gentaro Kisaragi, a character in Kamen Rider Fourze
Taro Sato, a character in Kamen Rider Build
Taro Yamada, character in Yandere Simulator
Gut Buster Taro, a character from Kamen Rider Zero-One
Yumetaro, the protagonist of Gimmick!
Jataro Kemuri, a character in Danganronpa Another Episode: Ultra Despair Girls
Ryūtarō Naruhodō, an alias used by a character in The Great Ace Attorney 2: Resolve
Q-Taro Burgerberg (バーガーバーグ Q太郎), one of the participants in Your Turn to Die: Death Game By Majority, also known as Kimi Ga Shine -Tasuuketsu Death Game-
Ryotaro Dojima, a character in Persona 4
Koops, known as "Nokotarō" in Japan, support character in Paper Mario: The Thousand-Year Door
Sōtarō Ushigome/GaoBlack, a character of Hyakujuu Sentai Gaoranger.
Kotarō Sakuma/Koguma SkyBlue, a character of Uchu Sentai Kyuranger.
Tarō Momoi/Don Momotarō, a character and the leader of Avataro Sentai Donbrothers, based on Momotarō folklore.
Kōtarō Minami, the main character of Kamen Rider BLACK and Kamen Rider BLACK RX
Gyutaro, a character from Demon Slayer.

See also
Bandō Tarō, a nickname of Tone River
Taro, a famed Sakhalin Husky of the 1958 Japanese Antarctica expedition
Taro Tsujimoto, a fictitious Japanese ice hockey player selected in the 1974 NHL Draft
Ikutaro Kakehashi, whose nickname was Taro
Taro (disambiguation)

Japanese masculine given names